Labidosa sogai is a species of moth of the  family Tortricidae. It is found in Madagascar.

References

Moths described in 1960
Archipini